Brett Stocks (born 14 March 1963) is an Australian swimmer. He competed in the men's 100 metre breaststroke at the 1984 Summer Olympics.

References

External links
 

1963 births
Living people
Australian male breaststroke swimmers
Olympic swimmers of Australia
Swimmers at the 1984 Summer Olympics
Place of birth missing (living people)
Commonwealth Games medallists in swimming
Commonwealth Games bronze medallists for Australia
Swimmers at the 1986 Commonwealth Games
Medallists at the 1986 Commonwealth Games